Frank Jones Sulloway (born February 2, 1947) is an American psychologist. He is a visiting scholar at the Institute of Personality and Social Research at the University of California, Berkeley and a visiting professor in the Department of Psychology. After finishing secondary school at Moses Brown School in Providence, Rhode Island, Sulloway studied at Harvard College and later earned a PhD in the history of science at Harvard. He was a visiting scholar at the Massachusetts Institute of Technology.

He is best known for his claim that birth order exerts large effects on personality, and the subsequent debates about this issue. In his 1996 book Born to Rebel, Frank Sulloway suggested that birth order had powerful effects on the Big Five personality traits. He argued that firstborns were much more conscientious and socially dominant, less agreeable, and less open to new ideas compared to laterborns. However, critics such as Fred Townsend, Toni Falbo, and Judith Rich Harris, argue against Sulloway's theories. A full issue of Politics and the Life Sciences, dated September, 2000 but not published until 2004 due to legal threats from Sulloway, contains carefully and rigorously researched criticisms of Sulloway's theories and data. Subsequent large independent multi-cohort studies have revealed approximately zero-effect of birth order on personality.

His grandfather was the tennis player and attorney Frank Sulloway (1883–1981).

Awards
1980 Pfizer Award
1984 MacArthur Fellows Program

Books

References

External links

"Frank Sulloway", Charlie Rose

1947 births
Living people
21st-century American psychologists
MacArthur Fellows
Harvard College alumni
Moses Brown School alumni
20th-century American psychologists